The Buem constituency is one of the constituencies represented in the Parliament of Ghana. It elects one Member of Parliament (MP) by the first past the post system of election. It is located in the Jasikan district of the Oti Region of Ghana.

Boundaries
The constituency is located within the Jasikan district of the Oti Region of Ghana. It is one of two constituencies in this district, the other being the Akan constituency. The constituency was originally located within the Volta Region of Ghana until new Regions were created following the December 2018 referendum.

Members of Parliament

Elections

 
 
 NELSON ASAFO
 
 

 
 

Due to the death of Henry Ford Kamel of the NDC, a by-election was scheduled for 26 February 2013. This was won by Daniel Kosi Ashiaman of the NDC with a majority of 8,640 (78%) votes.

See also
List of Ghana Parliament constituencies

References 

Adam Carr's Election Archives
Ghana Web

Parliamentary constituencies in the Oti Region